H.O.T.S. is a 1979 sex comedy. The film stars three Playboy Playmates — Susan Kiger (January 1977), Pamela Bryant (April, 1978), and Sandy Johnson (June, 1974), as well as former Miss USA of 1972, Lindsay Bloom, sexploitation actress Angela Aames, and later genre movie veteran Lisa London in her film debut.  Danny Bonaduce appears in a supporting role.

The cast frequently appears in tight white T-shirts with the H.O.T.S. logo and red-orange shorts. Some reviewers believe this wardrobe inspired the Hooters uniforms.

Plot
Honey Shayne (Kiger) is a freshman at Fairenville University (known, according to a title card, as "Good old F.U.").  After unsuccessfully pledging the Pi sorority, and being publicly ridiculed by sorority president Melody Ragmore (Bloom), Honey joins with three other unsuccessful pledges (O'Hara, Terri, and Samantha) to form a new sorority (to be known as H.O.T.S. after their initials) with the goal of stealing all of the rival sorority's boyfriends.

The movie includes a number of competitions intended to accomplish that goal, including a fundraiser (a kissing booth), a dance, and a climactic game of strip football. Both groups play pranks on the other and attempt to avoid disciplinary actions from the F.U. administration. A subplot deals with the attempts of two bungling gangsters to recover money hidden in the renovated building housing the sorority.

A running gag during the movie is the source of the name "H.O.T.S."  While the closing credits reveal that the name is an anagram of the first names of the four founders, other characters in the film believe it to stand for Hands Off Those Suckers and Hold On To Sex. At one point, the girls claim it stands for Help Out The Seals.

Cast

Main

Supporting

Release

H.O.T.S. was released in May 1979 in the U.S. It was released in the early 1980s throughout Western Europe. In West Germany, the film was released under the title of T&A Academy. T&A Academy was also the film's working title in the U.S.

Critical response

Review aggregation website Rotten Tomatoes, which collects both contemporary and modern reviews, gives the film a score of 29% based on reviews from 7 critics.

Home media

H.O.T.S. was released on DVD by Anchor Bay Entertainment in 2012. It is now out of print and the movie never received a Blu-ray release.

References

External links

Review at Bad Movies Report

1979 films
1970s sex comedy films
American sex comedy films
1970s English-language films
Films about fraternities and sororities
Teen sex comedy films
1979 comedy films
1970s American films